Most Much! is an album by saxophonist Jimmy Forrest recorded in 1961 and released on the Prestige label.

Reception

Scott Yanow of AllMusic states, "Jimmy Forrest was a very consistent tenor, able to infuse bop and swing standards with soul and his distinctive tone... Enjoyable music from the warm tenor".

Track listing
All compositions by Jimmy Forrest except where noted.
 "Matilda"  (Norman Span) – 4:50
 "Annie Laurie" (Traditional) – 7:46
 "Autumn Leaves"  (Joseph Kosma, Johnny Mercer, Jacques Prévert) – 4:28
 "My Buddy" (Walter Donaldson, Gus Kahn) – 2:44
 "I Love You" (Harry Archer, Harlan Thompson) – 5:16  
 "Soft Winds"  (Benny Goodman) – 5:40
 "Robbin's Nest" (Illinois Jacquet, Bob Russell, Sir Charles Thompson) – 8:51
 "Most Much" – 6:41
 "Sonny Boy" (Lew Brown, Buddy DeSylva, Ray Henderson) – 3:19

Personnel
Jimmy Forrest – tenor saxophone
Hugh Lawson – piano
Tommy Potter – bass
Clarence Johnston – drums
Ray Barretto – congas
Esmond Edwards – supervisor
Rudy Van Gelder – engineer

References

Jimmy Forrest albums
1961 albums
Prestige Records albums
Albums recorded at Van Gelder Studio
Albums produced by Esmond Edwards